Blaž Rola was the defending champion but chose not to defend his title.

Kacper Żuk won the title after defeating Mathias Bourgue 6–4, 6–2 in the final.

Seeds

Draw

Finals

Top half

Bottom half

References

External links
Main draw
Qualifying draw

2021 ATP Challenger Tour
Split Open